21-Deoxycortisone, also known as 21-desoxycortisone, 11-keto-17α-hydroxyprogesterone, or 17α-hydroxypregn-4-ene-3,11,20-trione, is a naturally occurring, endogenous steroid and minor intermediate and metabolite in corticosteroid metabolism. It is related to 21-deoxycortisol (11β,17α-dihydroxyprogesterone) and is reversibly formed from it by 11β-hydroxysteroid dehydrogenase, analogously to the reversible formation of cortisone from cortisol. 21-Deoxycortisone can be transformed into cortisone by 21-hydroxylase.

See also
 11-Dehydrocorticosterone
 11-Ketoprogesterone
 17α-Hydroxyprogesterone

References

Corticosteroids
Human metabolites
Pregnanes
Triketones